Dhari Othman is a sub-district located in Al Makhadir District, Ibb Governorate, Yemen. Dhari Othman had a population of  6664 as of 2004.

References 

Sub-districts in Al Makhadir District